Celo-Zongo Airport  is an airport serving Zongo in Kongo Central Province, Democratic Republic of the Congo.

See also

 List of airports in the Democratic Republic of the Congo

References

 OurAirports - Celo-Zongo
 Celo-Zongo

External links
 HERE Maps - Celo-Zongo

Airports in Kongo Central Province